Tu Cheng-sheng (born 10 June 1944) is a Taiwanese politician and historian. Tu served as the Minister of Education of the Republic of China during Chen Shui-bian's second term as President.

Education and career
Tu Cheng-sheng graduated from the Provincial Tainan Normal University (present-day National University of Tainan) in 1966. He also attended the National Taiwan University in 1970 and majored in history (bachelor's degree 1970, master's degree 1974). He is a specialist in the history of ancient Chinese society, culture and medicine.

In articles of 1986, 1987 and 1992 Tu explored semblance between the city-states of the ancients Western civilization and the state formations of early China.

He served as Director of National Palace Museum from May 2000 to May 2004. He also served as a director of a research center on history and languages of the Academia Sinica and a professor at the National Tsing Hua University.

Personality 
Tu gained notoriety for his colorful and abrasive behavior. After being filmed asleep at a 2007 meeting of the Legislative Yuan, he was photographed picking his nose in response to public criticism. Also that year, he grabbed a reporter's microphone and shoved a cameraman into a wall.

Publications
 
 , translation: Ilha Formosa: the Emergence of Taiwan on the World Scene in the 17th Century

References

Living people
1944 births
Taiwanese educators
20th-century Taiwanese historians
Taiwanese Ministers of Education
National Taiwan University alumni
Politicians of the Republic of China on Taiwan from Kaohsiung
Members of Academia Sinica
Writers from Kaohsiung
21st-century Taiwanese historians